Betzy "Betty" Christiane Smidth (5 March 1819 – 31 January 1892) was a Danish stage actress and opera soprano.  She is known to have been the opera primadonna of the Norwegian stage in the mid 19th-century.

She was from Denmark, and made her debut in Copenhagen in 1836.  She was engaged at the Christiania Theatre in Oslo in Norway in 1837-50, where she reportedly succeeded Augusta Schrumpf as the leading operatic star of the Norwegian stage.  She was particularly known for her ability as a soubrette, and among her more famed roles where Angela in Black Domino.

She resumed her career in Denmark in 1850, where she had a moderately successful career at the Kasinoteatern and Folketheatret until her retirement in 1884.

References 
 Smidth, Betzy (kaldet Betty) Christiane i Carl Frederik Bricka, Dansk Biografisk Leksikon (första utgåvan, 1902)
 https://web.archive.org/web/20080222171249/http://www.hf.uio.no/imv/forskning/forskningsprosjekter/norgesmusikk/musikkhistarkiv/Qvamme/Kjerulf_opera.html
 Norge: Teater i Salmonsens Konversationsleksikon (andra utgåvan, 1924)
 Schrumpf, Augusta i Carl Frederik Bricka, Dansk Biografisk Leksikon (första utgåvan, 1901)
 Børre Qvamme: Norsk musikkhistorisk arkiv. Børre Qvammes samlinger. HALFDAN KJERULF OG OPERAEN

1819 births
1892 deaths
19th-century Norwegian actresses
19th-century Danish women opera singers